The Dinosaur Diamond is a  scenic and historic byway loop through the dinosaur fossil laden Uinta Basin of the U.S. states of Utah and Colorado. The byway comprises the following two National Scenic Byways:
The  Dinosaur Diamond Prehistoric Highway in Carbon, Duchesne, Emery, and Grand counties, Utah; and
The  Dinosaur Diamond National Scenic Byway in Garfield, Mesa, Moffat, and Rio Blanco counties, Colorado.
The highway forms a diamond-shaped loop with vertices at Moab, Helper, Vernal and Grand Junction.

Notable features along the Dinosaur Diamond include Dinosaur National Monument, the Flaming Gorge National Recreation Area, Canyonlands National Park, Arches National Park, Natural Bridges National Monument, Colorado National Monument, and several national forests.

The path of Interstate 70 (I‑70) in Colorado is derived from two previous highways, U.S. Highway 6 (US 6) and US 40. US 40 was an original piece of the U.S. Highway system commissioned in 1926. The portion now numbered US 6 came about in 1937 when the route over Vail Pass was paved. The first route through the path of I-70 in Utah was the Old Spanish Trail, a trade route between Santa Fe, New Mexico, and Los Angeles, California. The trail was in common use before the Mexican–American War in 1848.

Route description

Colorado 
The following Colorado routes are included in the Colorado portion of the Dinosaur Diamond Scenic and Historic Byway:
  between Grand Junction and the Utah state line. (I-70 runs concurrently with US 6 and US 50 in this area)
  between Dinosaur and the Utah state line
  between Dinosaur and Rangely
  between Fruita and Rangely

The easternmost starting point of the Dinosaur Diamond (DD) begins in Grand Junction, Colorado, on I-70. In the vicinity of Grand Junction are the White River, Uncompahgre, and Grand Mesa National Forests. Other notable features nearby include the Powderhorn Resort, and the geologic features of Book Cliffs and Grand Mesa.

Traveling about  westbound on I-70 will lead to Fruita, a small town within view of the Colorado National Monument, which features numerous scenic hiking trails. From the trails, one may view attractions such as the Book Cliffs and Coke Ovens overlooks, and unique rock formations such as Independence Monument and the "Kissing Couple".  Fruita is also the home of Mike the Headless Chicken, and hosts an annual festival in his honor every May. A small statue dedicated to Mike can also be seen in the town.

Just west of Fruita, the byway turns north onto SH-139, traveling  to the next town of Rangely, and traversing the Douglas Pass. Nearby attractions include the Rangely Outdoor Museum and the Cañon Pintado ("painted canyon") Historic District petroglyphs, which is listed on the National Register of Historic Places.

Nearby Dinosaur is the "crown jewel" of the DD, the Dinosaur National Monument, which claims to be the most productive Jurassic Period dinosaur quarry in the world. The monument includes a walkway where visitors can view a sandstone wall embedded with over 2,000 dinosaur bones, and watch paleontologists chip away the sandstone to expose the fossilized dinosaur bones. Visitors can also see the preparation laboratory where dinosaur fossils are cleaned and preserved.

Upon leaving Dinosaur, the DD continues west on US 40 and crosses the border into Utah.

Utah 
The Utah portion of the Dinosaur Diamond Prehistoric Highway is routed along these highways:
  between Colorado state line and Cisco, again from Crescent Junction to Green River (I-70 runs concurrently with US 6 and US 50 in this area)
  from Green River to Helper
  from Vernal to Colorado state line
  from Moab to Vernal
  from Cisco to Moab

Vernal borders the western end of the Dinosaur National Monument; other notable attractions nearby include Steinaker State Park, Red Fleet State Park, Flaming Gorge National Recreation Area, and the Ashley National Forest.

Roosevelt is located on the edge of the Uintah and Ouray Indian Reservation. Heading  to the west is the county seat of Duchesne, located within the reservation. Nearby Duchesne are Starvation State Park and Kings Peak (the highest point in Utah), which is part of the Uinta Mountain range. The Uinta Mountains are one of the few mountain ranges in the contiguous United States which run east–west, and are the highest range to do so.

The numerous attractions surrounding Price include College of Eastern Utah Prehistoric Museum, Manti-La Sal National Forest, Huntington Lake State Park, Scofield State Park, and Ninemile Canyon which features numerous petroglyphs. Also nearby is the Cleveland-Lloyd Dinosaur Quarry, a prehistoric mud trap which claims to be the densest concentration of Jurassic dinosaur fossils in the world.

Notable features surrounding Green River include the San Rafael Swell, Green River State Park, and Goblin Valley State Park. Also nearby is Crystal Geyser, a rare (but man-made) cold water geyser caused by the expansion of carbonized "soda pop" water within. Within Green River, US 191 converges with I-70 for a short while and diverges again, south towards the city of Moab,  from Green River.

Just south of the junction of US 191 and SR-128, the city of Moab features a number of nearby attractions. Arches National Park, Canyonlands National Park, Dead Horse Point State Park, and the Newspaper Rock and Potash Road petroglyphs.

Leaving Moab, the DD continues north along SR-128 to its terminus with I-70 in Cisco. Traveling east along I-70, before completing the "diamond" back in Grand Junction, Colorado.

History
The segment within Colorado was designated the Dinosaur Diamond Scenic and Historic Byway by the Colorado Transportation Commission in 1997. The segment within Utah was designated the Dinosaur Diamond Prehistoric Highway by the Utah State Legislature in 1998. The highway was approved as a National Scenic Byway in 2002.

National Scenic Byways must go through a nomination procedure, and must already be designated as a state scenic byway in order to be nominated (However, roads that meet all criteria and requirements for national designation but not state or designation criteria may be considered for national designation on a case-by-case basis).

To be considered for designation "a road or highway must significantly meet at least one of the six scenic byways intrinsic qualities". The qualities are scenic, natural, historic, cultural, archeological, or recreational. A "corridor management plan" must also be developed, with community involvement, and the plan "should provide for the conservation and enhancement of the byway's intrinsic qualities as well as the promotion of tourism and economic development". The final step is when the highway (or highways) is approved for designation by the Secretary of Transportation.

Colorado history 
The path of I-70 in Colorado is derived from two previous highways, US 6 and US 40. US 40 was an original piece of the U.S. Highway system commissioned in 1926. The portion now numbered US 6 came about in 1937 when the route over Vail Pass was paved. A portion of this route was also numbered US 24 at the time.

In the 1920s, SH-139 was an unimproved road from US 6 at Fruita north to SH-64 in Rangely.

Utah history 

The first route through this portion of Utah was the Old Spanish Trail, a trade route between Santa Fe, New Mexico and Los Angeles, California. The trail was in common use before the Mexican–American War in 1848. Although the trail serves a different route than I-70, they were both intended to connect southern California with points further east. I-70 generally parallels the route of the Old Spanish Trail west of Crescent Junction.

The Utah State Road Commission took over US 40 from Kimball Junction to Colorado in 1910 and 1911, and assigned the SR-6 designation to this route by the mid-1920s. In late 1926, the American Association of State Highway Officials (AASHO) assigned the designation of US 40 to this cross-state route, consisting of most of SR-4 and all of SR-6. (The SR-6 designation remained until the 1977 renumbering; SR-4 became SR-2 in 1962 and was eliminated in favor of I-80 in 1977.)

The road connecting Colton on SR-8 (US 50, now US 6) with SR-6 (US 40) in Duchesne became a state highway in 1910. The southwest end was moved from Colton to Castle Gate in 1912, and in 1927 it was numbered State Route 33. Few changes were made to the roadway, and in 1981 it became part of US 191.

Access between Moab and Castle Valley was originally via a pack trail called the Heavenly Stairway. Isolated from Utah's population centers, this area depended on Grand Junction and other cities in Colorado for both everyday supplies and a market for agricultural products. Moab residents pushed for a road to be built along the riverbank. By 1902, the trail was replaced with a toll road, called King's Toll Road, after Samuel King. King was an early settler who also operated the toll ferry used prior to the construction of the Dewey Bridge. Rocks inscribed with "Kings Toll Road" can still be found along the roadway. While the road did improve travel, it was not built high enough above the river level and was often flooded.

Gallery

See also

List of Colorado Scenic and Historic Byways
List of Utah Scenic Byways
Scenic byways in the United States

References

External links 

 America's Byways
 America's Scenic Byways
 Colorado Department of Transportation
 Colorado Scenic & Historic Byways Commission
 Colorado Scenic & Historic Byways
 Utah Department of Transportation

National Scenic Byways
Tourist attractions in Colorado
Tourist attractions in Utah
Interstate 70
U.S. Route 6
U.S. Route 40
U.S. Route 50
U.S. Route 191